Peak tree iguana is a common name for two species of iguana:

 Liolaemus chillanensis
 Liolaemus monticola

Animal common name disambiguation pages